Lahij is a governorate of Yemen. It was previously part of South Yemen before Yemen's unification in 1990.

In 2015, the Governorate was subject to the Lahij insurgency, which was part of the Yemeni Civil War.

Geography

Adjacent governorates

 Taiz Governorate (northwest)
 Dhale Governorate (north)
 Abyan Governorate (east)
 Aden Governorate (south)

Districts
Lahij Governorate is divided into the following 15 districts. These districts are further divided into sub-districts, and then further subdivided into villages:

 Al Hawtah District
 Al Had District
 Al Madaribah Wa Al Arah District
 Al Maflahy District
 Al Maqatirah District
 Al Milah District
 Al Musaymir District
 Al Qabbaytah District
 Habil Jabr District
 Halimayn District
 Radfan District
 Tuban District
 Tur Al Bahah District
 Yafa'a District
 Yahr District

See also 
 Lahij
 Sultanate of Lahej

References

External links 
 District subdivision map of Lahij Governorate

 
Governorates of Yemen